Jason Howard is an American comic book artist known for such comics as Trees with Warren Ellis and The Astounding Wolf-Man with Robert Kirkman.

References

External links

Living people
American comics artists
Image Comics
Year of birth missing (living people)